Margaret, Lady Brooke, Ranee of Sarawak (born Margaret Alice Lili de Windt; 9 October 1849 – 1 December 1936) was the ranee of the second White Rajah of Sarawak, Charles Anthony Johnson Brooke. She published her memoir, My Life in Sarawak, in 1913. The memoir offers a rare glimpse of life in The Astana in Kuching and colonial Borneo. The Ranee became legendary during her lifetime as a woman of strength and intelligence, as well as on account of her status, which she shared with the other White Rajahs, of being at once an English subject and also an Asian monarch.

Life
Born Margaret Alice Lili de Windt, she was the daughter of Captain Joseph Clayton Jennyns de Windt, of Blunston Hall, and Elizabeth Sarah Johnson. Her brother, Harry de Windt, was a well-known explorer. She married Rajah Charles at Highworth, Wiltshire on 28 October 1869. She was raised to the title of Ranee of Sarawak with the style of Her Highness upon their marriage. The marriage was arranged to solve the succession issue in Sarawak. She followed her spouse to Sarawak, where she became the first in her position, the previous (and first) Rajah being unmarried. The Astana was built specially for her as a wedding present by her spouse. Ranee Margaret Brook was described as intelligent, forceful, non-sentimental and with the ability to dominate by her presence and, though her relationship with Charles soon deteriorated, she secured an independent position for herself and left Charles in the 1880s.

Her first three children died within a week of each other on board ship in the Red Sea 1873, while returning to England with the Rajah. Once three more sons were born, the couple separated again and lived estranged, with Rajah Charles living in Sarawak and Margaret in London, where she was at the centre of a social circle that included several of the leading literary talents of the 1890s, such as Oscar Wilde and Henry James. She financed the education of her sons by pawning the diamond Star of Sarawak, and arranged the marriages of her sons by organising social events for the British aristocracy and introducing her sons to daughters of the British nobility to marry. Her title of ranee or queen gave her a position in London society and through it she gave prestige to Sarawak.

Compositions 
Margaret Brooke composed the national anthem of Sarawak, the Gone Forth Beyond the Sea, in 1872.

Legacy 
Fort Margherita, also in Kuching, was named after her.

One of Oscar Wilde's fairy-tales, "The Young King", is dedicated to "Margaret, Lady Brooke, The Ranee of Sarawak".

Works 
 My Life in Sarawak (Methuen & Co., 1913)
 Impromptus (Edward Arnold, 1923)
 Good Morning & Good Night (Constable & Co., 1934)

See also
 List of Sarawakian consorts
 White Rajahs
 Kingdom of Sarawak

References

Sources
Koninklijk Genootschap voor Geslacht- en Wapenkunde, Nederlandse Genealogieen 11, Den Haag 1996 (Literature regarding Broek-De Wind)
M. R. H. Calmeyer, de Wind, de Windt, de Wint, Name: De Nederlandsche Leeuw; Location: The Nederlands; Date: 1981;, Pag 23. Co - Author Mr. O. Schutte.

External links
 

1849 births
1936 deaths
19th-century English musicians
19th-century British women musicians
20th-century English memoirists
20th-century English women writers
English women non-fiction writers
Malaysian royal consorts
Margaret Brooke
Wives of knights
Writers from Paris
National anthem writers
English women songwriters